Valgjärv refers to several lakes in Estonia:

 Otepää Valgjärv, Kanepi Parish, Põlva County
 Nohipalu Valgjärv, Kanepi Parish, Põlva County
 Koorküla Valgjärv, Tõrva Parish, Valga County

See also
 Valgejärv (disambiguation)